Sykopetra is a village in the Limassol District of Cyprus, located 5 km north of Arakapas.

Historical Data: 

As the archaeological findings of the area testify, the settlement of Sykopetra existed from the time of the Cypriot kingdoms. More specifically from 1050 BC. by 725 BC. It is worth noting that in the older years copper was extracted in the area.

The village of Sykopetra existed from the Byzantine period up to the Ottoman domination of the island, as witnessed by the various toponyms of the area. At the time of the Frankish occupation the village was assigned to the Order of the Knights, while in the 14th century it was transferred to the Order of the Knights of the Ioannina.

The community of Sykopetra consists, besides the village of Sykopetra, the settlement of Prophet Elias which is more modern and according to historical sources in the past was called Lampiris. It was renamed by the first resident who built the Church of the Prophet Elias after finding a picture of the Prophet on a nearby river.

Crops and Occupations:

The inhabitants of Sykopetra are engaged in agriculture and the most important cultivation are mandarins and other species of fruit trees.

In addition, wild vegetation thrives in the village. More specifically, the deep valleys of the community of Sykopetra are covered by riverside vegetation, such as plane trees, Oleander, etc. On the slopes there are many types of trees, shrubs and weeds.

References

Communities in Limassol District